The Williamson System was a mathematical system used to rank college football teams. The system was created by Paul B. Williamson, a geologist and member of the Sugar Bowl committee.

The NCAA college football records book includes the Williamson System as a "major selector" of national championships for the years 1932-1963.

Paul Williamson died in 1955. His son Mitch Williamson subsequently took up his father's syndicated column for the 1955–1963 seasons.

National champions

The following teams were ranked No. 1 by the Williamson System for the 1932–1963 college football seasons.

The NCAA Football Bowl Subdivision Records book contains five apparent errors in its listing of Williamson System champions. The following table contains the contemporary champions syndicated by Paul Williamson. The NCAA record book's errors are documented in the Notes column.

References

College football rankings